Isabelle Tsakiris (born 19 November 1960) is an Australian former cricketer who played as a right-arm off break bowler. She appeared in one Test match for Australia in 1992, against England, taking 7 wickets in the match. She played domestic cricket for South Australia.

References

External links
 
 
Isabelle Tsakiris at southernstars.org.au

1960 births
Living people
Cricketers from Adelaide
Australia women Test cricketers
South Australian Scorpions cricketers